Senator Winston may refer to:

Fountain Winston (1793–1834), Mississippi State Senate
Francis D. Winston (1857–1941), North Carolina State Senate